

Winners and nominees

1980s

1990s

2000s

2010s

2020s

Records
 Most awarded director: Jesús Acuña Lee, 4 times.
 Most awarded director (ever winner): Carlos Guerra, 3 times.
 Most nominated director: Jesús Acuña Lee with 5 nominations.
 Most nominated director without a win: Daniel Ferrer with 2 nominations.
 Directors winning after short time: Armando Zafra and Luis Rodríguez by (La candidata, 2017) and (Caer en tentación, 2018), 2 consecutive years.
 Director winning after long time: Jesús Acuña Lee by (Senda de gloria, 1988) and (Yo compro esa mujer, 1991), 4 years difference.

References

External links 
TVyNovelas at esmas.com
TVyNovelas Awards at the univision.com

Direction of the Camaras
Direction of the Camaras
Direction of the Camaras